The 54th Directors Guild of America Awards, honoring the outstanding directorial achievements in films, documentary and television in 2001, were presented on March 9, 2002 at the Hyatt Regency Century Plaza. The ceremony was hosted by Carl Reiner. The nominees in the feature film category were announced on January 22, 2002 and the other nominations were announced starting on February 1, 2002.

Winners and nominees

Film

Television

Commercials

Frank Capra Achievement Award
 Burton Bluestein

Robert B. Aldrich Service Award
 Edwin Sherin

Franklin J. Schaffner Achievement Award
 Anita Cooper-Avrick

Honorary Life Member
 Delbert Mann

References

External links
 

2001 film awards
2001 television awards
Directors Guild of America Awards
Direct
Direct
Directors
Direct
2002 in Los Angeles
March 2002 events in the United States